Single-level may refer to:

 Single-level cell, a type of solid-state computer storage media
 Single-level pylon, an electricity pylon for an arrangement of all conductor cables on a pylon in one level

See also

 Single-levelling